Sergio Rey Revilla (born November 4, 1969 in San Sebastián, Gipuzkoa) is a former boxer from Spain, who represented his native country at the 1992 Summer Olympics in Barcelona, Spain. There he was eliminated in the first round of the light welterweight division (– 63.5 kg) by Finland's eventual bronze medalist Jyri Kjäll.

External links
  Spanish Olympic Committee

1969 births
Living people
Sportspeople from San Sebastián
Light-welterweight boxers
Boxers at the 1992 Summer Olympics
Olympic boxers of Spain
Spanish male boxers